John Ridley was a footballer who played as a right full back for Manchester City between 1927 and 1933.

Ridley joined Manchester City in September 1927, displacing Sam Cookson in the team. He made his debut in a 1–0 victory against South Shields. Ridley made 174 league appearances for Manchester City.

References

English footballers
Manchester City F.C. players
English Football League players
Association football defenders
Year of birth missing